Innovations is a 1985 studio album released by Puerto Rican salsa group, El Gran Combo de Puerto Rico. It was the first #1 release on the Billboard Tropical Albums chart, established in June 1985.

Critical reception

José A. Estévez, Jr. of Allmusic gave the album a mixed review criticizing the lack of novelties while stating Juan Cabeza Dura, No Me Olvides and La Loma del Tamarindo were "servicable".

Chart performance

See also
List of number-one Billboard Tropical Albums from the 1980s

References

1985 albums
El Gran Combo de Puerto Rico albums
Spanish-language albums